Dan Valentino Fascinato (born January 23, 1961) is a Canadian-born former professional ice hockey defenceman. Fascinato was selected by the Colorado Rockies in the seventh round (127th overall) of the 1980 NHL Entry Draft.

Fascinato played major junior hockey in the Ontario Hockey League (OHL) with the Ottawa 67's before turning professional after completing final junior season to play in the 1981 Central Hockey League playoffs with the Fort Worth Texans.

International
Fascinato played with the Italy men's national ice hockey team at both the 1989 and 1990 Men's World Ice Hockey Championships (Group B).

Career statistics

References

External links

Living people
1961 births
Sportspeople from Guelph
Ice hockey people from Ontario
Canadian ice hockey defencemen
Colorado Rockies (NHL) draft picks
Durham Wasps players
Fort Worth Texans players
HC Milano Saima players
HC Varese players
Italian ice hockey players
Muskegon Mohawks players
Ottawa 67's players
Wichita Wind players
Canadian expatriate ice hockey players in England
Canadian expatriate ice hockey players in Italy